CNRP may refer to:

 Carbon nanotube reinforced polymer, a type of composite, a plastic with carbon nanotube reinforcement
 Cambodia National Rescue Party, a former major Cambodian political party of Cambodia
 Algerian National Commission for the Census of the Population (CNRP), former name of Algeria's National Office of Statistics